Larry Vernon Hedges is a researcher in statistical methods for meta-analysis and evaluation of education policy. He is Professor of Statistics and Education and Social Policy, Institute for Policy Research, Northwestern University. Previously, he was the Stella M. Rowley Distinguished Service Professor of Education, Sociology, Psychology, and Public Policy Studies at the University of Chicago. He is a member of the National Academy of Education and a fellow of the American Academy of Arts and Sciences, the American Educational Research Association, the American Psychological Association, and the American Statistical Association. In 2018, he received the Yidan Prize for Education Research, the world's most prestigious and largest education prize, i.e. USD four million.

He has authored a number of articles and books on statistical methods for meta-analysis, which is the use of statistical methods for combining results from different studies. He also suggested several estimators for effect sizes and derived their properties. He carried out research on the relation of resources available to schools and student achievement, most notably the relation between class size and achievement.

Bibliography

References

External links
 
 

Living people
American statisticians
American social scientists
Northwestern University faculty
University of Chicago faculty 
Stanford University alumni
Fellows of the American Statistical Association
Fellows of the American Academy of Arts and Sciences
Fellows of the American Psychological Association
Educational researchers
Year of birth missing (living people)